Weende may refer to:

Weende (Leine), a river of Lower Saxony, Germany, tributary of the Leine
Weende, Göttingen, a district of Göttingen, Lower Saxony, Germany